North Fork Stinking River is a  long 2nd order tributary to the Stinking River in Pittsylvania County, Virginia.  This is the only stream of this name in the United States.

Course 
North Fork Stinking River rises about 0.5 miles southwest of Brutus, Virginia and then flows generally south to join the Stinking River about 1.5 miles north of Greenfield.

Watershed 
North Fork Stinking River drains  of area, receives about 45.5 in/year of precipitation, has a wetness index of 395.50, and is about 59% forested.

See also 
 List of Virginia Rivers

References 

Rivers of Virginia
Rivers of Pittsylvania County, Virginia
Tributaries of the Roanoke River